Bertice Jacelon (1915 - 13 August 2013) was a West Indian cricket umpire. He stood in two Test matches in 1962.

See also
 List of Test cricket umpires
 Indian cricket team in West Indies in 1961–62

References

1915 births
2013 deaths
Place of birth missing
West Indian Test cricket umpires